Gymnostylus signatus is a species of beetle in the family Cerambycidae. It was described by Per Olof Christopher Aurivillius in 1916. It is known from Ivory Coast, Cameroon, and the Democratic Republic of the Congo.

References

Pachystolini
Beetles described in 1916
Taxa named by Per Olof Christopher Aurivillius